The 1992 FIFA World Player of the Year award was won by Marco van Basten. The gala took place at the Casino Estoril in Lisbon, Portugal on February 1, 1993, organised by FIFA, the European Sports Media and the Portuguese newspaper A Bola. 71 national team coaches were chosen to vote. It was sponsored by Adidas.

Results

References

FIFA World Player of the Year
FIFA World Player of the Year